Halsnead Garden Village is a proposed village close to the Halsnead area of Whiston in Knowsley, Merseyside.

Proposal 
The plan for the village includes over 1500 homes, a country park, a new primary school, and a variety of community and leisure facilities. It is "one of the biggest residential developments on Merseyside", at a cost of £270M.

In February 2022 Knowlsey Council granted permission for housebuilder Taylor Wimpey to start redeveloping 40 acres at the site for a 350-home development, forming part of the south-eastern parcel of the land.

References

External links 
 https://www.gov.uk/government/news/first-ever-garden-villages-named-with-government-support
 https://www.theguardian.com/society/2017/jan/02/fourteen-garden-villages-to-be-built-england-48000-homes-green-belt

Proposed populated places in the United Kingdom
Towns and villages in the Metropolitan Borough of Knowsley